John Schneider (born January 1, 1945) was a Canadian football player who played for the Winnipeg Blue Bombers. He played college football at the University of Toledo and is a member of their athletic hall of fame (inducted 1982).

References

1945 births
Living people
American football quarterbacks
Canadian football quarterbacks
American players of Canadian football
Toledo Rockets football players
Winnipeg Blue Bombers players